The Presbytery of Newton is a regional governing body for Presbyterian congregations located in northwestern New Jersey and affiliated with the Presbyterian Church (USA).  Established in 1817 to oversee congregations in northwestern New Jersey and northeastern Pennsylvania, the Presbytery of Newton currently includes 59 member churches located in the counties of Sussex, Morris, Warren and Hunterdon.  The Presbytery of Newton is one of 22 presbyteries that comprise the Synod of the Northeast, which oversees 1,130 churches in New Jersey, New York, and the New England states.

A presbytery is a confederation of congregations united and accountable for management of church affairs in local region. It makes decisions regarding these affairs often as a quasi-representative body, or committee, with members representing each congregation—typically the minister and an elder 'commissioned' from each parish.  This body often includes additional representatives that include other clergy not affiliated with a congregation such as theological college professors, chaplains, and retired ministers.

Aside from these 59 member churches and the presbytery's various mission projects (domestic and overseas), the Presbytery of Newton is also connected to the Johnsonburg Camp and Retreat Center in Johnsonburg, New Jersey, and a private preparatory school, Blair Academy in Blairstown, New Jersey.  Its offices are located on State Route 10 in Randolph Township, New Jersey.

History
The Presbytery of Newton was created in October 1817 during a convention of the Synod of New York and New Jersey in October 1817.  It was decided to divide the northern territory of the Presbytery of New Brunswick into a new presbytery. The original boundary of the Presbytery of Newton was determined to run from the Delaware River north of Lambertville, New Jersey, including all of Hunterdon, Morris and Sussex Counties (which then included present-day Warren County and stretched west to the ridge of the Pocono Mountains in Pennsylvania including most of Northampton and Monroe counties.  At that time, the Presbytery of Newton included 24 churches—in New Jersey the congregations at Knowlton, Hardwick, Marksboro, Newton, Hackettstown, German Valley, Fox Hill, Lamington, Baskingridge, Bethlehem, Kingwood, Alexandria, Greenwich, Harmony, Oxford, Mansfield, Pleasant Grove, Flemington, Amwell 1st and 2nd; and in Pennsylvania 4 congregations at Easton, Lower Mount bethel, Upper Mount Bethel and Smithfield.  These 24 congregations shared 9 full-time pastors.  Several of the congregations stemmed from ethnic German congregations, including German Valley and Knowlton—communities that were first settled by Palatine Germans and affiliated with either the German Reformed or Lutheran faiths. In 1823, a German and Dutch Reformed congregation at Stillwater (founded in 1769) was received by the Presbytery.

Member churches
, the following 59 church congregation are overseen by the Presbytery of Newton.

Hunterdon County
 Bloomsbury: First Presbyterian Church of Bloomsbury
 Califon: Fairmount Presbyterian Church
 Califon: Lower Valley Presbyterian Church
 Hampton: Musconetcong Valley Presbyterian Church

Morris County
 Boonton: First Presbyterian Church of Boonton
 Cedar Knolls: Hildale Park Presbyterian Church
 Chatham: Ogden Memorial Presbyterian Church
 Chatham: Presbyterian Church of Chatham Township
 Chester: Community Presbyterian Church
 Denville: Union Hill Presbyterian Church
 Dover: First Memorial Presbyterian Church
 East Hanover: First Church of Hanover
 East Hanover: Kitchell Memorial Presbyterian Church
 Flanders: United Presbyterian Church, Flanders
 Florham Park: Calvary Presbyterian Church
 Gillette: Meyersville Presbyterian Church
 Long Valley: Long Valley Presbyterian Church
 Madison: Presbyterian Church of Madison
 Mendham: First Presbyterian Church of Mendham
 Mine Hill: Mine Hill Presbyterian Church
 Morris Plains: Presbyterian Church of Morris Plains
 Morristown: Presbyterian Church in Morristown
 Mount Freedom: Mount Freedom Presbyterian Church
 New Vernon: First Presbyterian Church of New Vernon
 Parsippany: Parsippany Presbyterian Church
 Rockaway: First Presbyterian Church of Rockaway
 Schooley's Mountain: Highlands Presbyterian Church
 Stirling: First Presbyterian Church, Stirling
 Succasunna: First Presbyterian Church of Succasunna
 Wharton: First Presbyterian Church of Berkshire Valley
 Wharton: Hungarian Presbyterian Church of Wharton
 Wharton: Wharton United Community Church
 Whippany: First Presbyterian Church of Whippany

Sussex County
 Andover: Andover Presbyterian Church
 Branchville: First Presbyterian Church of Branchville
 Franklin: First Presbyterian Church of Franklin
 Fredon: Yellow Frame Presbyterian Church
 Newton: First Presbyterian Church of Newton
 Ogdensburg: First Presbyterian Church of Ogdensburg
 Sparta: First Presbyterian Church of Sparta
 Stanhope: First Presbyterian Church of Stanhope
 Stillwater: Stillwater Presbyterian Church
 Sussex: First Presbyterian Church of Sussex
 Wantage: Beemerville Presbyterian Church

Warren County 
 Allamuchy: Panther Valley Ecumenical Church
 Alpha: United Presbyterian Church of Alpha
 Belvidere: United Presbyterian Church in Belvidere
 Blairstown: First Presbyterian church of Blairstown
 Delaware: Delaware Presbyterian Church
 Hackettstown: First Presbyterian Church of Hackettstown
 Hazen: First Presbyterian Church of Oxford at Hazen
 Oxford: Oxford Second Presbyterian Church
 Phillipsburg: Presbyterian Church in Harmony
 Phillipsburg: Pilgrim Presbyterian Church
 Phillipsburg: Westminster Presbyterian Church
 Port Murray: Rockport Presbyterian Church
 Stewartsville: Old Greenwich Presbyterian Church
 Stewartsville: Stewartsville Presbyterian Church
 Washington: First Presbyterian Church of Washington

Defunct churches
 Hamburg: First Presbyterian Church of Hamburg
 Hardyston: North Hardyston Church
 Marksboro: Marksboro Presbyterian Church

References

External links
 Presbytery of Newton (website)

 
Presbyterianism in New Jersey
Presbyterian Church (USA) presbyteries